Michal Handzuš (born 11 March 1977) is a Slovak former professional ice hockey centre. Handzuš played for hometown club, HC ’05 Banská Bystrica of the Slovak Extraliga before joining the National Hockey League (NHL) in 1998. Handzuš played for the St. Louis Blues, Phoenix Coyotes, Philadelphia Flyers, Los Angeles Kings, San Jose Sharks and the Chicago Blackhawks, with whom he won the Stanley Cup with in 2013.

Handzuš represented Slovakia at several international ice hockey tournaments, including the 2002, 2010 and 2014 Winter Olympics.

Playing career
Handzuš played in the 1991 Quebec International Pee-Wee Hockey Tournament with a youth team from Poprad, Slovakia.

The Blues' line of Pavol Demitra, Ľuboš Bartečko and Handzuš were known as the "Slovak Pack" line. Handzuš finished second in voting for the Frank J. Selke Trophy, awarded annually to the NHL's top defensive-forward, following the  season.

Handzuš was traded on 13 March 2001, along with Ladislav Nagy, Jeff Taffe and two first-round draft picks, to the Phoenix Coyotes in exchange for Keith Tkachuk. Handzuš then spent two seasons with Phoenix.

On 12 June 2002, Handzuš was traded along with Robert Esche to the Philadelphia Flyers in exchange for Brian Boucher and a third-round draft pick. On 5 December 2002, he became only the second player in NHL history to score a penalty shot goal in overtime. In the  season, he finished second on the Flyers with 58 points and later signed a three-year contract extension with Philadelphia during the ensuing off-season. During the 2004–05 NHL lockout, he played for the HKm Zvolen, which reached the playoff finals in the Slovak Extraliga.

On 4 August 2006, Handzuš was traded to the Chicago Blackhawks in exchange for Kyle Calder. Only eight games into his season with Chicago, however, Handzuš suffered a torn anterior cruciate ligament (ACL), which sidelined him for the remainder of the  season.

On 2 July 2007, Handzuš signed a four-year, $16 million contract with the Los Angeles Kings.

On 1 July 2011, Handzuš signed a two-year, $5 million contract with the San Jose Sharks. During the lockout-shortened 2012–13 season, on 1 April 2013, Handzuš was traded back to Chicago in exchange for a fourth-round draft pick.

On 24 June 2013, Handzuš and the Blackhawks defeated the Boston Bruins 3–2 in Game 6 of the 2013 Stanley Cup Finals to win the Stanley Cup. In the following off-season, on 5 July, Handzuš re-signed to a one-year contract to remain with the team. On 19 March 2014, he played in his 1,000th career NHL game.

On 28 May 2014, with the Blackhawks facing elimination in Game 5 of the Western Conference Finals, Handzuš scored a game-winning goal in double-overtime against Los Angeles Kings, the eventual Stanley Cup champions. On 16 June, after the Blackhawks had been eliminated from playoff contention, the team announced that they would not be re-signing Handzuš after the season. He subsequently became an unrestricted free agent on 1 July.

Management career
Post-playing career, Handzuš joined the leadership of the Slovak Ice Hockey Federation, but resigned in September 2022 after the organization chose to continue allowing national team members to play in the KHL despite the ongoing 2022 Russian invasion of Ukraine saying, "It is a fundamental value issue for me, and that is why I cannot imagine my further work in this direction of the organization,” in a statement posted to Twitter.

Career statistics

Regular season and playoffs

International

Awards and achievements
This is the list of achievements of Michal Handzuš:

See also
Slovaks in the NHL

References

External links

 
 
 
 
 

1977 births
HC '05 Banská Bystrica players
Chicago Blackhawks players
HKM Zvolen players
Ice hockey players at the 2002 Winter Olympics
Ice hockey players at the 2010 Winter Olympics
Ice hockey players at the 2014 Winter Olympics
Living people
Los Angeles Kings players
Olympic ice hockey players of Slovakia
Sportspeople from Banská Bystrica
Philadelphia Flyers players
HK Poprad players
Phoenix Coyotes players
San Jose Sharks players
Stanley Cup champions
St. Louis Blues draft picks
St. Louis Blues players
Slovak ice hockey centres
Slovakia men's national ice hockey team coaches
Worcester IceCats players
Slovak expatriate ice hockey players in the United States